Tapocyon ("dog from Tapo Canyon") is an extinct genus of placental mammals from clade Carnivoraformes, that lived in North America during the middle Eocene. Tapocyon was about the size of a coyote and is believed to have been a good climber that spent a lot of time in trees.

Phylogeny
The phylogenetic relationships of genus Tapocyon are shown in the following cladogram:

See also
 Mammal classification
 Carnivoraformes
 Miacidae

References

†
Miacids
Extinct animals of the United States
Prehistoric placental genera